Leukocyte immunoglobulin-like receptor subfamily A member 4 is a protein that in humans is encoded by the LILRA4 gene.

This gene encodes an immunoglobulin-like cell surface protein preferentially expressed in plasmacytoid dendritic cells (PDCs). This gene is highly expressed in PDCs, and is found to be rapidly down-regulated by interleukin 3 (IL3). This gene is one of the 19 highly related genes that form a leukocyte immunoglobulin-like receptor gene cluster (LRC) at chromosomal region 19q13.4.

References

Further reading

Immunoglobulin superfamily